James Khristian Middleton (born August 12, 1991) is an American professional basketball player for the Milwaukee Bucks of the National Basketball Association (NBA). He is a three-time NBA All-Star and won an NBA championship with the Bucks in 2021.

Middleton attended high school at the Porter-Gaud School in his hometown of Charleston, South Carolina. He played college basketball for the Texas A&M Aggies from 2009 to 2012. He earned second-team All-Big 12 honors after leading the Aggies in scoring with 14.3 points per game during his sophomore season.

Middleton declared for the 2012 NBA draft after his junior season and was selected by the Detroit Pistons with the 39th overall pick. He saw limited action with the Pistons and spent time with the Fort Wayne Mad Ants of the NBA Development League during his rookie season. Middleton was traded to Milwaukee in 2013 and became an immediate contributor to the team. He received his first All-Star selection in 2019. In 2021, Middleton helped lead the Bucks to their first NBA championship since 1971. The same summer, he won a gold medal at the Olympics.

Early life and high school
Middleton was born on August 12, 1991 in Charleston, South Carolina to James and Nichelle Middleton. He has one older sister named Brittney, and his cousin, Josh Powell, has played in the NBA. Another cousin, Kenny Manigault, played basketball for Wichita State University and was teammates with Middleton on the Amateur Athletic Union (AAU) team Carolina Celtics. Two other teammates on the Carolina Celtics accepted Division I basketball scholarships, Jamal Curry (Radford) and Devin Booker (Clemson).

Middleton attended Porter-Gaud School and played basketball for the Cyclones under coach John Pearson. As a sophomore, he averaged 12 points and eight rebounds per game. In his junior season, Middleton posted averages of 21 points and 8.6 rebounds per game and was named state player of the year. He repeated as player of the year as a senior, scoring 22.4 points per game and grabbing 8.6 rebounds per game in leading Porter-Gaud to the state title game. Middleton was named Most Valuable Player of the Porter-Gaud Holiday Classic, scoring 22 points in the championship. He was nominated for the 2009 McDonald's All-American Boys Game, but was not selected to participate.

ESPN ranked him the 64th best prospect in the Class of 2009, and noted he was the best shooter at his position. Middleton was recruited by Texas A&M, Virginia Tech, South Carolina, Michigan, and Saint Joseph's. He chose Texas A&M, and signed with the Aggies on May 30, 2008. He liked the college town atmosphere, and got along well with the coaching staff.

College career

Freshman year
Middleton was recruited by then Texas A&M assistant coach Scott Spinelli. Coming into his freshman year, Middleton expected to fill the three point shooting void of departed senior Josh Carter. Middleton's college career started slowly, connecting on 1-of-12 field goals in limited action of his first three games. After a season-ending leg injury to Derrick Roland on December 11, 2009, Middleton was forced to take a larger role in the offense and started 18 of the last 20 games. On February 3, 2010, he scored 16 points to help Texas A&M erase an 11-point second half deficit to defeat Missouri 77–74. In a 69–53 NCAA Tournament Round of 64 victory over Utah State, Middleton scored a season-high 19 points on 7-of-10 shooting. Texas A&M's season ended with a loss in the Round of 32 to Purdue; the Aggies finished with a record of 24–10. Overall, Khris Middleton averaged 7.2 points and 3.7 rebounds per game and led the team in scoring five times.

Sophomore year
As a sophomore, Middleton led the team and finished ninth in the Big 12 in scoring at 14.3 points per game while also contributing 5.2 rebounds per game. He hit 45 percent of his shots from the floor and 78.4 percent of his free throws. Middleton scored in excess of 10 points in 27 games and led the team in scoring 16 times. He scored a career-high 31 points in a 71–62 overtime victory over Arkansas, including 11 of the team's last 12 points in regulation. This earned him Big 12 Player of the Week and Oscar Robertson National Player of the Week honors for the week of December 13–19, 2010. On January 15, 2011, Middleton tallied 28 points, including 11 in overtime, to defeat Missouri 91–89.

Middleton-led Texas A&M went 24–9 and lost in the NCAA Tournament Round of 64 to Florida State 57–50, in a contest in which Middleton contributed 16 points. He was selected to the All-Big 12 Second Team at the conclusion of the regular season. The U.S. Basketball Writers Association named Middleton to the 10-man All-District VII team covering college basketball players in the states of Texas, Arkansas, and Louisiana. He was recognized as an All-Eighth District second-team selection by the National Association of Basketball Coaches making him eligible for the State Farm Division I All‐America teams. Since the Big 12 Conference was its own district, this is equivalent to being named second team All-Big 12 by the NABC.

Junior year

Prior to Middleton's junior season, head coach Mark Turgeon left to take the same position at the University of Maryland and was replaced by Billy Kennedy of Murray State. Middleton was impressed with Kennedy's coaching acumen and chose to remain an Aggie. He was listed on the preseason watchlist for the Wooden Award. Middleton was a unanimous choice to the preseason All-Big 12 team.

Despite being the preseason co-favorite in the league, Texas A&M finished 14–18 overall and 4–14 in the Big 12. The team was hampered by a rash of injuries, including a knee injury that forced Middleton to sit for 12 games. He averaged 13.2 points and 5.0 rebounds per game, down from the previous season. On April 9, 2012, Middleton declared for the NBA Draft, forgoing his final season of collegiate eligibility. He thanked Texas A&M in a statement.

Professional career

Detroit Pistons (2012–2013)
Middleton was selected by the Detroit Pistons with the 39th overall pick in the 2012 NBA draft. On August 15, 2012, he signed his rookie scale contract with the Pistons. On December 12, 2012, he was assigned to the Fort Wayne Mad Ants of the NBA Development League (known now as the G League). A week later, he was recalled by the Pistons. He finished his rookie season having managed just 27 games for the Pistons while averaging 6.1 points, 1.9 rebounds and 1.0 assists in 17.6 minutes per game.

Milwaukee Bucks (2013–present)

2013–14 season: Sophomore season 
On July 31, 2013, Middleton was traded, along with Brandon Knight and Viacheslav Kravtsov, to the Milwaukee Bucks in exchange for guard Brandon Jennings. In contrast to his limited action in 2012–13, Middleton played all 82 games in 2013–14, while starting 64 and averaging 12.1 points, 3.8 rebounds, 2.1 assists and 1.0 steals in 30.0 minutes per game. On December 6, 2013, he scored a then career-high 29 points in a 109–105 win over the Washington Wizards.

2014–15 season: First playoff appearance 
On December 15, 2014, the Bucks were down by one to the Phoenix Suns with under four seconds remaining in regulation as Middleton hit a contested game-winning buzzer beater to defeat the Suns, 96–94, with Middleton finishing with 14 points. On March 7, 2015, he scored a then-career-high 30 points on 11-of-20 shooting in a 91–85 win over the Washington Wizards. In his second season with the Bucks, Middleton emerged as an important "3-and-D" player, shooting 46.7 percent from the floor and 40.7 percent from behind the three-point arc. He averaged 13.4 points, 4.4 rebounds and 2.3 assists per game.

2015–16 season: New contract 
On July 9, 2015, Middleton re-signed with the Bucks to a five-year, $70 million contract, with a player option for the fifth year. This constituted a significant pay raise for Middleton, as he earned $915,000 the prior year. On December 29, 2015, in a loss to the Oklahoma City Thunder, he scored a career-high 36 points on 13-of-22 from the field and 6-of-9 from three-point range. On March 4, 2016, in a win over the Minnesota Timberwolves, he scored 32 points on 11-of-16 shooting, including 8-of-9 on three-pointers, marking the most three-pointers made by a Bucks player since Carlos Delfino had eight on March 18, 2011. He tied his career high of 36 points on April 10, 2016, in a 109–108 overtime win over the Philadelphia 76ers.

2016–17 season: Injury and surgery 
On September 21, 2016, Middleton was ruled out for six months after sustaining a left hamstring injury in preseason workouts that required surgery. On February 8, 2017, he made his season debut after missing the first 50 games with the hamstring injury, scoring five points in 15 minutes in a 106–88 loss to the Miami Heat. On March 17, 2017, he scored 14 of his season-high 30 points in the fourth quarter of the Bucks' 107–103 win over the Los Angeles Lakers.

2017–18 season: Breakthrough 

On November 1, 2017, Middleton scored a then career-high 43 points in a 126–121 loss to the Charlotte Hornets. On November 22, 2017, he scored 40 points in a 113–107 overtime win over the Phoenix Suns. On January 20, 2018, he had his first career-triple double with 23 points, 14 rebounds and 10 assists in a 116–94 loss to the Philadelphia 76ers. In Game 1 of the Bucks' first-round playoff series against the Boston Celtics, Middleton had 31 points, eight rebounds and six assists in a 113–107 overtime loss. The Bucks went on to lose the series in seven games, despite Middleton's 32 points in a 112–96 loss in Game 7.

2018–19 season: First All-Star selection 
On October 22, 2018, Middleton hit 7 of 8 3-pointers and finished with 30 points in a 124–113 win over the New York Knicks. On December 29, despite a quad injury, Middleton scored 29 points in a 129–115 win over the Brooklyn Nets. On January 31, 2019, Middleton was named an Eastern Conference All-Star reserve, thus earning his first All-Star selection. He became the first G League alum to be named an All-Star. On February 21, 2019, he had 15 points and a season-high 13 rebounds in a 98–97 win over the Celtics. On March 28, he scored a season-high 39 points in a 128–118 win over the Los Angeles Clippers.

2019–20 season: Career high in scoring 
Following the 2018–19 season, Middleton signed a five-year, $178 million contract extension with Milwaukee. On January 28, 2020, Middleton set a new career-high, scoring 51 points, making 16 of 26 shots, including 7 of 10 on 3-pointers, in a 151–131 victory over the Washington Wizards. After the game, Middleton dedicated his performance to Kobe Bryant, who died two days prior in a California helicopter crash, saying “I definitely can dedicate that game to him as a thank you for what he did for the game”. On January 30, 2020, Middleton was named an Eastern Conference All-Star reserve, thus earning his second consecutive All-Star selection. On February 24, Middleton scored 40 points in a 137–134 overtime win over the Wizards. Middleton missed a game against the Oklahoma City Thunder on February 28 due to neck soreness. In the postseason, Middleton and the Bucks were eliminated in the Semi-Finals by the eventual Eastern Conference champion Miami Heat in five games. Middleton scored a playoff career-high 36 points, along with 8 rebounds and 8 assists, in the lone Milwaukee victory in Game 4.

2020–21 season: Championship season 
The following season, Middleton continued to play a key role on the Bucks, averaging 20.4 points per game, a career-high 5.4 assists per game, and 6 rebounds per game during the regular season.
That postseason, the Bucks would again face the Heat in the playoffs, this time in the First Round. In Game 1, Middleton capped off a 27-point, 6-rebound and 6-assist performance with a game-winning fadeaway jumper with 0.5 seconds left in overtime, to lift Milwaukee to a 109–107 victory and a 1–0 series lead. The Bucks would go on to win the series in 4 games. In Game 6 of the Conference Semifinals against the Brooklyn Nets, Middleton dropped a playoff career-high 38 points, alongside 10 rebounds, five assists, and five steals in a 104–89 victory. In  Game 3 of the Conference Finals against the Atlanta Hawks, Middleton tied his career-high 38 points, alongside 11 rebounds and seven assists in a 113–102 victory. In Game 6 of the Conference Finals against the Hawks, Middleton dropped 32 points in a 118–107 win, leading the Bucks to the NBA Finals for the first time since 1974. In Game 4 of the Finals, he scored a playoff career-high 40 points to help defeat the Phoenix Suns. In Game 6, Middleton recorded 17 points, 5 rebounds and 5 assists, and made crucial baskets in the final minutes of the game to put away the Suns 105–98, closing out the series 4–2, securing the Bucks’ first NBA title in fifty years, and giving Middleton his first championship.

2021–22 season: Season-ending injury 
In the first game of the 2021–22 NBA season, Middleton scored 20 points and recorded 9 rebounds in a 127–104 blowout win over the Brooklyn Nets. On November 1, Middleton entered the NBA’s health and safety protocol after testing positive for COVID-19. Middleton returned to the Bucks as they played the Lakers on November 17 after missing eight games. He scored 16 points and notched 6 assists, tying Ray Allen for the most made three-pointers in Milwaukee Bucks history. In the next game, against the Oklahoma City Thunder on November 19, he passed Allen with his first shot in a 96–89 victory. On December 13, Middleton hyperextended his knee in a loss against the Boston Celtics, and missed the following three games. On January 22, 2022, Middleton led the Bucks to a 133-127 win over the Sacramento Kings with a then-season-high 34 points. On February 3, it was announced that Middleton had been selected as an All-Star for the 2022 NBA All-Star Game. On March 6, Middleton scored a season-high 44 points along with 8 rebounds and 5 assists in a 132–122 win against the Phoenix Suns.

On April 20, in a Game 2 loss during Milwaukee’s first round postseason matchup against Chicago, Middleton suffered a medial collateral ligament sprain, which sidelined him for the rest of the playoffs. The Bucks beat the Bulls in five games, but lost the Eastern Conference semifinals to the Celtics in seven games.

2022–23 season: Comeback
On December 3, 2022, Middleton made his return after missing the first twenty games of the season while recovering from an off-season wrist surgery, finishing with 17 points and 7 assists during a 133–129 loss to the Los Angeles Lakers. In December and January, Middleton missed eighteen consecutive games due to knee soreness. On February 4, 2023, Middleton scored a then season-high 24 points, along with seven rebounds and four assists in 20 minutes off the bench in a 123–115 win over the Miami Heat. On March 13, Middleton scored a season-high 31 points and delivered 9 assists in a 133–124 win over the Sacramento Kings.

Career statistics

NBA

Regular season

|-
| style="text-align:left;"| 
| style="text-align:left;"| Detroit
| 27 || 0 || 17.6 || .440 || .311 || .844 || 1.9 || 1.0 || .6 || .1 || 6.1
|-
| style="text-align:left;"| 
| style="text-align:left;"| Milwaukee
| 82 || 64 || 30.0 || .440 || .414 || .861 || 3.8 || 2.1 || 1.0 || .2 || 12.1
|-
| style="text-align:left;"| 
| style="text-align:left;"| Milwaukee
| 79 || 58 || 30.1 || .467 || .407 || .859 || 4.4 || 2.3 || 1.5 || .1 || 13.4
|-
| style="text-align:left;"| 
| style="text-align:left;"| Milwaukee
| 79 || 79 || 36.1 || .444 || .396 || .888 || 3.8 || 4.2 || 1.7 || .2 || 18.2
|-
| style="text-align:left;"| 
| style="text-align:left;"| Milwaukee
| 29 || 23 || 30.7 || .450 || .433 || .880 || 4.2 || 3.4 || 1.4 || .2 || 14.7
|-
| style="text-align:left;"| 
| style="text-align:left;"| Milwaukee
| style="background:#cfecec;"| 82* || style="background:#cfecec;"| 82* || 36.4 || .466 || .359 || .884 || 5.2 || 4.0 || 1.5 || .3 || 20.1
|-
| style="text-align:left;"| 
| style="text-align:left;"| Milwaukee
| 77 || 77 || 31.1 || .441 || .378 || .837 || 6.0 || 4.3 || 1.0 || .1 || 18.3
|-
| style="text-align:left;"| 
| style="text-align:left;"| Milwaukee
| 62 || 59 || 29.9 || .497 || .415 || .916 || 6.2 || 4.3 || .9 || .1 || 20.9
|-
| style="text-align:left;background:#afe6ba;"|†
| style="text-align:left;"| Milwaukee
| 68 || 68 || 33.4 || .476 || .414 || .898 || 6.0 || 5.4 || 1.1 || .1 || 20.4
|-
| style="text-align:left;"| 
| style="text-align:left;"| Milwaukee
| 66 || 66 || 32.4 || .443 || .373 || .890 ||  5.4 || 5.4 || 1.2 || .3 || 20.1
|- class="sortbottom"
| style="text-align:center;" colspan="2"| Career 
| 651 || 576 || 31.8 || .458 || .392 || .881 || 4.9 || 3.8 || 1.2 || .2 || 17.1
|- class="sortbottom
| style="text-align:center;" colspan="2"| All-Star
| 3 || 0 || 21.7 || .357 || .400 || 1.000 || 3.7 || 2.7 || .0 || .0 || 10.0

Playoffs

|-
| style="text-align:left;"| 2015
| style="text-align:left;"| Milwaukee
| 6 || 6 || 38.7 || .380 || .324 || .933 || 3.7 || 2.0 || 2.3 || .5 || 15.8
|-
| style="text-align:left;"| 2017
| style="text-align:left;"| Milwaukee
| 6 || 6 || 38.5 || .397 || .368 || .818 || 4.7 || 5.3 || 2.0 || .0 || 14.5
|-
| style="text-align:left;"| 2018
| style="text-align:left;"| Milwaukee
| 7 || 7 || 39.3 || .598 || .610 || .737 || 5.1 || 3.1 || .9 || .7 || 24.7
|-
| style="text-align:left;"| 2019
| style="text-align:left;"| Milwaukee
| 15 || 15 || 34.3 || .418 || .435 || .835 || 6.3 || 4.4 || .6 || .0 || 16.9
|-
| style="text-align:left;"| 2020
| style="text-align:left;"| Milwaukee
| 10 || 10 || 35.5 || .394 || .354 || .826 || 6.9 || 6.0 || 1.1 || .2 || 20.3
|-
| style="text-align:left; background:#afe6ba;"|2021†
| style="text-align:left;"|Milwaukee
| style="background:#cfecec;"|  23* || style="background:#cfecec;"|  23* || 40.1 || .438 || .343 || .887 || 7.6 || 5.1 || 1.5 || .2 || 23.6
|-
| style="text-align:left;"| 2022
| style="text-align:left;"| Milwaukee
| 2 || 2 || 36.0 || .417 || .429 || 1.000 || 5.0 || 7.0 || 1.5 || .0 || 14.5
|- class="sortbottom"
| style="text-align:center;" colspan="2"| Career 
| 69 || 69 || 37.7 || .435 || .391 || .862 || 6.3 || 4.7 || 1.3 || .2 || 20.0

College

|-
| style="text-align:left;"| 2009–10
| style="text-align:left;"| Texas A&M
| 34 || 22 || 20.9 || .416 || .324 || .750 || 3.7 || 1.1 || .9 || .3 || 7.2
|-
| style="text-align:left;"| 2010–11
| style="text-align:left;"| Texas A&M
| 33 || 33 || 29.6 || .450 || .361 || .784 || 5.2 || 2.8 || 1.2 || .1 || 14.3
|-
| style="text-align:left;"| 2011–12
| style="text-align:left;"| Texas A&M
| 20 || 17 || 28.8 || .415 || .260 || .750 || 5.0 || 2.3 || 1.0 || .3 || 13.2
|- class="sortbottom"
| style="text-align:center;" colspan="2"| Career 
| 87 || 72 || 26.0 || .431 || .321 || .768 || 4.6 || 2.0 || 1.0 || .2 || 11.3

Personal life
Middleton is a Christian.

On July 7, 2015, Middleton penned a column in The Players' Tribune about the Charleston church shooting. He explained that the shooting affected him deeply because he grew up in Charleston and his grandmother Juanita knew four of the nine people who died. Middleton had met one of the victims, Cynthia Hurd, as she dropped her nephew off at a basketball camp not long before the shooting. "In Charleston, we're staying strong, but the wounds are still deep," he wrote.

On April 23, 2019, Middleton and his girlfriend welcomed their first daughter. In order to be there for the birth, Middleton got on a plane to Milwaukee with Bucks co-owner Marc Lasry immediately after a playoff win over the Detroit Pistons.

On March 13, 2020, Middleton said he would match Giannis Antetokounmpo's $100,000 donation to the staff of the Fiserv Forum who were unable to work during the suspension of the 2019–20 NBA season because of the COVID-19 pandemic.

On April 8, 2021, it was announced that he was joining the ownership group of the Brisbane Bullets, a professional basketball team in Australia.

References

External links

Milwaukee Bucks bio

1991 births
Living people
21st-century African-American sportspeople
2019 FIBA Basketball World Cup players
African-American basketball players
American men's basketball players
Basketball players at the 2020 Summer Olympics
Basketball players from South Carolina
Detroit Pistons draft picks
Detroit Pistons players
Fort Wayne Mad Ants players
Medalists at the 2020 Summer Olympics
Milwaukee Bucks players
National Basketball Association All-Stars
Olympic gold medalists for the United States in basketball
Shooting guards
Small forwards
Sportspeople from Charleston, South Carolina
Texas A&M Aggies men's basketball players
United States men's national basketball team players